The Alliance of Liberties was a political party in Morocco.

History and profile
The party was founded by Ali Bel Haj in March 2002. It was a moderate and reformist party.

In the legislative elections of 27 September 2002, the party won 4 out of 325 seats. In the next parliamentary election, held on 7 September 2007, the party won 1 out of 325 seats.

The party became an observer member of the Liberal International at the latter's Marrakesh Congress in 2006.

It was dissolved and merged into the Authenticity and Modernity Party in 2008.

References

2002 establishments in Morocco
2008 disestablishments in Morocco
Political parties established in 2002
Political parties disestablished in 2008
Defunct political parties in Morocco